Coast Mountain Bus Company (CMBC) is the contract operator for bus transit services in Metro Vancouver and is a wholly owned subsidiary of the South Coast British Columbia Transportation Authority, known locally as TransLink, the entity responsible for public transit in the region. The buses form part of the integrated transit network of the Lower Mainland.

History 
The Coast Mountain Bus Company was created on April 1, 1999, concurrent with the implementation of TransLink. Bus service in Metro Vancouver was formerly provided by BC Transit, the provincial government crown corporation that operates transit outside of Metro Vancouver.

Services 
Coast Mountain Bus Company operates the buses throughout Greater Vancouver, except for some routes in West Vancouver, which are run by its own municipal transit system. One contract operator provides select Community Shuttle service, and another contract operator provides HandyDART services:

 220 bus routes in total
This includes:
 Regular transit service
 School specials
 Express coach service to/from suburban municipalities
Trolley bus service – 13 routes primarily in the City of Vancouver
 NightBus – special late-night routes that generally start service at approximately 1 am
 B-Line express bus (1 route)
RapidBus express bus (5 routes)
 Community shuttles – routes operating minibuses that connect to the larger ones
 SeaBus – passenger ferry across the Burrard Inlet

The regional transit network including bus routes, service levels and fares are set by TransLink.

B-Line 

B-Lines are a type of express bus route with bus rapid transit elements using mostly  low-floor articulated buses. All B-Line routes currently in operation feature all-door boarding .

One route is currently in operation:
 99 B-Line: Broadway between UBC Exchange and Commercial–Broadway station, via Broadway–City Hall station

Four routes no longer operate:
95 B-Line: Waterfront station to Simon Fraser University's Burnaby campus. This service was rebranded as the R5 Hastings St RapidBus.
96 B-Line: From Newton Exchange to Guildford Mall. This service was rebranded as the R1 King George Blvd RapidBus.
97 B-Line: From Coquitlam Central station to Lougheed Town Centre station. It was replaced by the Millennium Line's Evergreen Extension.
 98 B-Line: Granville Street and No. 3 Road between Burrard station and Richmond Centre. It was replaced by the Canada Line.

RapidBus 

On January 6, 2020, two of the existing B-Line routes (the 95 and the 96) were rebranded as RapidBus routes (routes R5 and R1 respectively), and the following routes began service:
R3 Lougheed Hwy: Lougheed Highway between Coquitlam Central station in Coquitlam and Haney Place Exchange in Maple Ridge. It complements the existing 701 route servicing local stops.
R4 41st Ave: 41st Avenue between UBC Exchange and Joyce–Collingwood station, entirely within Vancouver. It replaced the 43 Express.

A third RapidBus was introduced on April 6, 2020:
R2 Marine Dr: Marine Drive, 3rd Street and Main Street between Park Royal Exchange in West Vancouver and Phibbs Exchange in North Vancouver, replacing the 239.

Fare Paid Zones 

A Fare Paid Zone is a clearly marked territory on which passengers must have valid proof of payment and present it for inspection upon request of a transit employee. Initially, these were only in effect in SkyTrain and SeaBus stations and vehicles until June 25, 2007, when the law was changed. Now, all buses, including West Vancouver Blue Buses, are designated Fare Paid Zones. The reason for implementing Fare Paid Zones on buses was to remove the responsibility of fare enforcement from bus drivers, as too many of them were being assaulted in disputes over fare payment. Fare enforcement on all buses are now the responsibility of the Transit Police and Transit Security Department. Officers may board a bus at any time and conduct a fare inspection. Those who fail to pay the fare and retain proof of payment could be removed from the bus and/or fined $173.

Facilities

Current facilities 
 Burnaby Transit Centre: Located at 3855 Kitchener Street, Burnaby, it was built in 1986. This transit centre is split into two facilities (north and south,) separated by Kitchener Street. Serving the North Shore, parts of Burnaby and Vancouver, Burnaby Transit Centre is also home to many support services such as Environmental Services, Trolley Overhead, Facilities Maintenance, Fire Prevention, and Non-Revenue Vehicle Maintenance. Beginning in September 2016, North Shore transit routes operate out of this transit centre. Fleet Overhaul at this location is where the majority of body repair and repainting is carried out, as well as engine and component overhaul, while minor repair is most likely carried out at the bus's home garage.
 Hamilton Transit Centre: Located at 4111 Boundary Road, Richmond, this facility opened in September 2016, and took over operations of various South Delta, Richmond, Burnaby and New Westminster routes. It is the second transit centre to have abilities to house CNG buses.
 Port Coquitlam Transit Centre: Located at 2061 Kingsway Avenue, Port Coquitlam, it opened in August 1978. It was the first garage to support Compressed Natural Gas (CNG) vehicles. Serves the Tri-Cities, New Westminster, Maple Ridge and Pitt Meadows areas.
 Richmond Transit Centre: Located at 11133 Coppersmith Way, Richmond, it opened on September 4, 2000. It is the main base for the suburban routes served by Orion V highway coaches and local routes in Richmond, White Rock, Delta, and some Burnaby, Surrey and Vancouver routes.
 Surrey Transit Centre: Located at 7740 132nd Street, Surrey, it opened in May 1975. It is the base for most Surrey, Langley, and North Delta services and some White Rock and Ladner services. As of May 2018, it is the third transit centre to have abilities to house CNG buses.
 Vancouver Transit Centre: Located at 9149 Hudson Street, Vancouver, it opened on September 2, 2006. It is the garage for Vancouver bus services. This garage serves the trolley routes, as well as most of Vancouver's buses.

Former facilities 
 North Vancouver Transit Centre (1946–2016): This depot, built in 1945, was located at 536 East 3rd Street, North Vancouver. It was the base for most North Shore services not operated by West Vancouver Municipal Transit. It closed in September 2016, and all North Vancouver routes now operate from Burnaby Transit Centre.
 Oakridge Transit Centre (1948–2016): Located at 949 West 41st Avenue, it opened in 1948. Oakridge was to be decommissioned and likely sold for re-development beginning in 2007. However, with the arrival of several New Flyer and Nova Bus orders starting in 2006, it remained an active support facility, conducting retrofitting on these vehicles in preparation for revenue service. Additionally, the Oakridge yard was home to many retired coaches, including E901/902 trolleys, New Flyer D40s, and other vehicles. In the second quarter of 2008, as part of a re-organization and expansion at Burnaby Transit Centre, Oakridge took over many of the tasks formerly located at the other facilities. The Community Shuttle service was one of the groups moved, making Oakridge an active transit centre once again. However, in September 2016, the shuttle operations were shifted to the new Hamilton Transit Centre. The property has since been sold for $440million to a developer.

Management and personnel

Employees 

CMBC's 5200+ employees are spread across Metro Vancouver.
 The 3700 bus operators, represented by Unifor Local 111, and the 1100 maintenance employees, represented by Unifor Local 2200, work out of the six regional depots.
 The SeaBus staff of 80, including marine attendants, deck officers, engineers, coordinators (also represented by Unifor Local 2200), and office staff work from their North Vancouver location.
 The 600 staff involved in scheduling, training, operational planning, and administrative services are spread throughout the system, as well as at CMBC's head office in New Westminster are represented by the Canadian Office and Professional Employees Union, Local 378.
 In October 2008, CMBC was named one of BC's Top Employers by Mediacorp Canada Inc.
 Coast Mountain Bus Company operates the Transit Security Department for TransLink. Transit security officers are mobile, ride buses and trains, inspect fares, issue fines and patrol TransLink properties (bus loops and exchanges, SkyTrain stations, SeaBus, etc.) and are authorized to arrest persons who commit criminal offences on or in relation to any TransLink properties per the Criminal Code. Transit security officers are also authorized to enforce Transit Conduct and Safety Regulations, as well as the Transit Tariff Bylaw under the South Coast British Columbia Transportation Authority Act (SCBCTA Act).

Labour disputes 
In 2001, over 3,400 workers rallied in a strike and disrupted transit service for 123 days, from April 1, 2001, to August 1, 2001. SeaBus service was not affected.

Fleet roster

Current fleet 

The following fleet is owned by TransLink and operated and maintained by CMBC.

Community Shuttle

SeaBus

Notes 
  All vehicles are wheelchair-accessible.
 All CMBC diesel buses are currently running on a 5% bio-diesel blend.

Prefixes 
Letter prefixes are prepended to the bus numbers on all conventional Coast Mountain buses, except trolleys. Generally, the prefixes are used to identify which garage the bus is operating from.

 B – Burnaby
 H – Hamilton
 P – Port Coquitlam
 R – Richmond
 S – Surrey (or Community Shuttle)
 V – Vancouver (formerly Oakridge)
 T – Training vehicle (or HandyDART)

Former prefixes 
These are prefixes not in use that were formerly used.
 N – North Vancouver (until September 2016)

Numbering 
Since 2012, Coast Mountain buses are numbered by the order year, series number and unit number. For example, bus number 12001 would have been ordered in 2012, is part of that year's "000" series (denoting New Flyer XDE60 articulated buses), and the first bus received. The order year may not reflect a bus' production year; bus number 12024 is the 24th bus in the same order placed in 2012 but was not produced until 2013. Series numbers vary by year and are often not reused on the same models each year. Community Shuttles since 2016 are always numbered in the "500" series. Prior to 2012, buses followed a legacy numbering system adopted from the former BC Transit Vancouver Regional Transit System, where buses would be numbered by series. Bus number 3334, for example, would be bus number 134 of the New Flyer C40LF/C40LFR 3200/3300 series. Unlike the current numbering system, all bus numbers ending in −00 would be skipped due to BC Transit policy. This was abolished when the new system was implemented in 2012. Exceptions to this are trolley buses, which follow a numbering scheme dating back to the British Columbia Electric Railway era, and older Community Shuttles, which followed either a three-digit system or the four-digit system of West Vancouver. These Community Shuttles carried "S" prefixes to denote "Shuttle" and their numbering systems did not skip bus numbers ending in −00.

Additional fleet notes 
The first prototype  New Flyer/Vossloh Kiepe low-floor trolley bus arrived at the Oakridge Transit Centre on July 2, 2005. The 187 additional vehicles of that type arrived in 2006–2007, and all had entered service by the end of 2007. The first  articulated trolley coach (#2501) arrived at the Oakridge Transit Centre in January 2007. The others started arriving in January 2008, and all 74 had entered service by the end of 2009.

It was announced that the original bike racks on the 2006 New Flyer buses can only be used in daylight, as they blocked the headlights at night. All of them have been replaced with a modified "V2W" rack.

Retired fleet 

The following fleet were owned by TransLink and operated and maintained by CMBC or demonstrated with CMBC.

Demonstrator units

Gallery of fleet examples

References

External links 
 Coast Mountain Bus Company
 Unifor Local 111
 TransLink / Greater Vancouver Transportation Authority
 Unifor Local 2200
 COPE 378

Bus rapid transit in Canada
Bus transport in British Columbia
Companies based in Surrey, British Columbia
Transport companies established in 1999
TransLink (British Columbia)
1999 establishments in British Columbia